1992 Ukrainian First League was the first Ukrainian First League season with the record number of teams participating in the league at 28 divided into groups. The season started on March 14 and finished July 5, 1992.

At the end of the season the five worst teams from each of the two groups were relegated to the Ukrainian Second League (the third tier). The winners of each group qualified for the top league for the next season. Somewhat surprising was the performance of such teams as Pryladyst Mukacheve and Artania Ochakiv that were just a few points short of qualifying for the Ukrainian Premier League.

Teams

In the 1992 season, the Ukrainian First League consisted mostly of clubs that had competed in the Soviet Second League (Ukrainian Zone). The league was split into two groups A (mostly western and central Ukraine) and B (mostly eastern and southern Ukraine).

Map

Pre-season organization

 Games of Chornomorets-2 were conducted at various stadiums such as Chornomorets Stadium, OSPO Stadium, ZRSS Stadium, Stankozavod Stadium, SRZ Stadium.
 Some games of Ros were conducted at the Kolos Stadium in Terezyne (Bila Tserkva Raion).
 Some games of Pryladyst were conducted at Spartak Stadium.
 Some games of Dnipro were conducted at Avanhard Stadium in Smila

Name changes before season
 The city of Kommunarsk changed back to Alchevsk
 Karpaty Kamyanka-Buzka relocated from Kamianka-Buzka to Stryi and changed its name to Skala Stryi
 Mayak Ochakiv changed its name to Artania Ochakiv
 Dynamo Bila Tserkva to Ros Bila Terkva
 Novator Mariyupil to Azovets Mariyupil
 Kolos Nikopil to Metalurh Nikopil

Group A

Final standings

Goalscorers
 Aleksei Snigiryov (FC Veres Rivne)            10
 Valeriy Kinashenko (FC Prykladnyk Mukacheve) 10
 Vitaliy Buhay (FC Podillya Khmelnytskyi)      7
 Yuriy Ovcharenko (FC Desna Chernihiv)       7
 Serhiy Serdiukov (FC Stal Alchevsk)          7
 Volodymyr Tymchenko (FC Polissya Zhytomyr)      7
 Oleksandr Ostashov (FC Dnipro Cherkasy)         7
 Vasyl Herasymchuk (FC Chaika Sevastopol)    7

Group B

Final standings

Goalscorers
 Denys Filimonov (FC Kryvbas Kryvyi Rih) 16
 Viktor Hromov (FC Shakhtar Pavlohrad)    14
 Oleksandr Haiduk (FC Ros Bila Tserkva)      11
 Vadym Oliynyk (FC Metalurh Nikopol)     10
 Hennadiy Moroz (FC Kryvbas Kryvyi Rih)      9
 Hennadiy Zamriy (FC Zakarpattia Uzhhorod)   9
 Oleksandr Pindeyev (FC Vorskla Poltava/FC Chornomorets-2 Odessa)       9
 Ihor Nichenko (FC Krystal Kherson/FC Metalist Kharkiv)      9

See also 
Ukrainian Premier League 1992
Ukrainian Second League 1992

References

External links
 Championship of Ukraine - Official site of the FFU
 Archive of championships of Ukraine on the site ukrsoccerhistory.com
 Ukrainian football from Axel

Ukrainian First League seasons
2
Ukra
Ukra